The Italian Superturismo Championship (Campionato Italiano Superturismo) is Italy's national motorsport series for touring cars. It was established in 1987 and its drivers' title has been held by such notable drivers as Le Mans winner Emanuele Pirro and two-time Champ Car champion Alex Zanardi.

History
Established in 1987 under Group A rules the series saw champions like Johnny Cecotto, Roberto Ravaglia and Nicola Larini winning the title before switching to Supertouring regulations in 1993. That season was won by Ravaglia in a BMW 318i. The next years would be dominated by Audi and their 80 and A4 Quattro models as Emanuele Pirro won in 1994 and 1995 and Rinaldo Capello in 1996. Ex-F1 driver Emanuele Naspetti took BMW's second title in 1997.

Alfa Romeo and Nordauto Engineering (the team that became N.Technology) had run the Alfa Romeo 155 during the 1993–1997 years but wouldn't win the series until they introduced their 156 model in 1998. Fabrizio Giovanardi won in that car both in 1998 and 1999.

Revival
The cancellation of the FIA Super Production championship in 2002 would mean the resumption of the Superturismo championship, albeit now under Super Production rules and named the Superproduzione. The SP cars were in many ways less advanced than the Super 2000 relatives in the ETCC. Salvatore Tavano won the 2003 Superproduzione season in an Alfa Romeo 147. The championship became an all-147 series in 2004 won by Adriano De Micheli. The season saw a very low number of entries with between four and six participants each weekend.

The ETCC became the World Touring Car Championship (WTCC) in 2005. At the same time the Superturismo was truly revived with Super 2000 rules. Alessandro Zanardi would win the first season in a BMW 320i. In 2006 SEAT joined the championship as a full works team with two Leóns driven by Roberto Colciago and Davide Roda. Colciago won the title ahead of returning 1997 champion Emanuele Naspetti in a BMW 320i.

In 2007 the championship changed its promoter to Peroni Promotion and was renamed ITCC (Italian Touring Car Competition). However, grids were small as several teams moved to the WTCC and the Superstars Series, and the series was merged with the Peroni-run Driver's Trophy midway through 2008.

For the 2016 season, the championship adopted TCR regulations for the main class.

Champions

Race winners

Driver Statistics

Manufactures Statistics

Statistics from 1993 to 1999 with D2 Cars

See also
Superstars Series

References

External links
News and results
List of champions 1987–1999

 
Touring car racing series
TCR Series
Recurring sporting events established in 1987
1987 establishments in Italy